Taylor Yarkosky (born March 6, 1977) is an American politician. He serves as a Republican member for the 25th district of the Florida House of Representatives.

Life and career 
Yarkosky was born in Albia, Iowa. He attended the University of Iowa.

In August 2022, Yarkosky defeated Liz Cornell, Matthew Silbernagel and Tom Vail in the Republican primary election for the 25th district of the Florida House of Representatives. In November 2022, he defeated Banks Helfrich in the general election, winning 66 percent of the votes.

References 

1977 births
Living people
People from Albia, Iowa
Republican Party members of the Florida House of Representatives
21st-century American politicians
University of Iowa alumni